Podhum may refer to:

Podhum, Konjic, a village in the Konjic municipality, Bosnia and Herzegovina
Podhum, Livno, a village in the Livno municipality, Bosnia and Herzegovina
Podhum, Croatia, a village in the Jelenje municipality
Podhum massacre, of Croat civilians by Italian occupation forces in 1942
Podhum, Tuzi, a village in the Tuzi Municipality